The feral subculture is a counter-cultural social movement originating in the latter part of the 20th century, mainly centred in Australia. The movement reached its heyday in the mid 1990s, in parallel with other similar movements in Europe and elsewhere. In common with those movements, the feral phenomenon can be seen as part of the wider counterculture.
In Australia, the ferals are often seen as an amalgam of the punk and hippie subcultures, with a radical environmental philosophy and many similarities to the gutter punk subculture. The movement, during the 1990s, was the subject of national attention, and as a phenomenon has been the subject of anthropological attention as a characteristically Australian "alternative lifestyle".

Going Tribal, a documentary by Light Source Films, examined the subculture in 1995.

The feral movement is strongly associated with radical environmentalism and a communal lifestyle, with many members residing on multiple occupancy properties. In common with the hippies before them, many members of the feral movement rely on a system of crash pads, squats, and extended networks of "friends of friends" throughout Australia to travel with a minimum of financial outlay.  Although the itinerant lifestyle and environmental beliefs most associated with the feral movement are akin to those of the earlier hippie movement, the ferals adopted a confrontational, politically charged style of dress, music, and philosophy more often associated with the punk movement.

See also
 Gutter punk
 Crust punk
 Hardcore punk
 Hardline (subculture)
 Straight edge

References

Further reading

External links
 St John, G Dr. 2000, Alternative Cultural Heterotopia:ConFest as Australia's Marginal Centre, School of Sociology, Politics and Anthropology, Faculty of Humanities and Social Sciences, La Trobe University, Melbourne, Australia.
 St John, G. 1999. Ferality: A Life of Grime. The UTS Review - Cultural Studies and New Writing, 5(2): 101-13.
 St John G. Ferals: Terra-ism and Radical Ecologism in Australia

Pejorative terms for people
Social class subcultures
Counterculture
Australian fringe and underground culture
Australian English
Communalism
Australian youth culture